Light poetry or light verse is poetry that attempts to be humorous.  Light poems are usually brief, can be on a frivolous or serious subject, and often feature word play including puns, adventurous rhyme, and heavy alliteration. Typically, light verse in English is formal verse, although a few free verse poets have excelled at light verse outside the formal verse tradition.

While light poetry is sometimes condemned as doggerel or thought of as poetry composed casually, humor often makes a serious point in a subtle or subversive way. Many of the most renowned "serious" poets, such as Horace, Swift, Pope, and Auden, also excelled at light verse.

Notable poets

English

 Richard Armour
 Max Beerbohm
 Hilaire Belloc
 John Betjeman
 Morris Bishop
 Lord Byron
 C. S. Calverley
 Lewis Carroll
 Charles E. Carryl
 Brian P. Cleary
 William Rossa Cole
 Wendy Cope
 Noël Coward
 Alma Denny
 Henry Austin Dobson
 T. S. Eliot 
 Willard R. Espy
 Gavin Ewart
 Charles Ghigna
 W. S. Gilbert
 Arthur Guiterman
 A. P. Herbert
 Oliver Herford
 Thomas Hood
 Frank Jacobs
 X. J. Kennedy
 Joyce La Mers
 Edward Lear
 Dennis Lee
 Newman Levy
 J. Patrick Lewis
 J. A. Lindon
 Don Marquis
 David McCord
 Phyllis McGinley
 David Morice
 Vladimir Nabokov
 Ogden Nash
 Dorothy Parker
 Alexander Pope 
 Maurice Sagoff
 Shel Silverstein
 James Kenneth Stephen
 Jonathan Swift
 John Updike
 John Whitworth
 John Wilmot

German

Wilhelm Busch
Heinz Erhardt
Robert Gernhardt
Christian Morgenstern
Joachim Ringelnatz
Erich Kästner
Eugen Roth
Mascha Kaléko

Dutch

Drs. P
Kees Stip

Publications
The following periodicals regularly publish light verse:
 Able Muse
 Light (formerly Light Quarterly), a journal of light verse
 The Spectator runs regular light verse competitions
 The Washington Post runs regular light verse competitions as part of its Style Invitational

See also
 Alla barnen
 Clerihew
 Double dactyl
 Epigram
 Limerick
 McWhirtle
 Michael Braude Award for Light Verse
 Nonsense verse

Genres of poetry
Comedy

de:Komische Lyrik